Singsaas is a surname. Notable people with the surname include:

 Hilde Singsaas (born 1972), Norwegian politician for the Labour Party
 Tor Singsaas (born 1948), Norwegian Lutheran minister 
 Petter Christian Singsaas (born 1972), Norwegian football player